Andrew Peter Lundin III (1944–2001) was a nephrologist. He was Assistant Professor of Medicine at SUNY Downstate Medical Center.

Biography
He was born in 1944. Despite having a single kidney, he was accepted into medical school at SUNY Downstate Medical Center. He married Maureen Fitzgerald. He died in 2001.

See also
Andrew Peter Lundin I

References

SUNY Downstate Medical Center faculty
1944 births
2001 deaths
American nephrologists
SUNY Downstate Medical Center alumni